Veronica Stigger (born 1973) is a Brazilian writer, journalist and art critic.

Stigger was born in Porto Alegre. The author of ten books to date, she has won several prizes including the Premio São Paulo and the Prêmio Açorianos. She was one of the authors included in the Bogota39 group of young Latin American writers.

Selected works
 O trágico e outras comédias - Angelus Novus, 2003; 7Letras, 2004
 Gran cabaret demenzial - Cosac Naify, 2007
 Os anões - Cosac Naify, 2010
 Opisanie swiata - Cosac Naify, 2013
 Sul - Editora 34, 2016.

References

1973 births
Living people
Brazilian writers
Brazilian women writers